Brandon Travis Rike  (born January 6, 1983) is a graphic designer and singer who currently resides in Columbus, Ohio. He was a founding member and the lead vocalist of rock band Dead Poetic from their formation in 1997 until their indefinite hiatus in 2007. He has since worked with various bands designing artwork, notably the cover for the Twenty One Pilots albums Trench (2018) and Scaled and Icy (2021).

Dead Poetic
Brandon Rike has been in the band Dead Poetic for several years.  The band was formed at a local church in 1997.  Rike has designed all of the band's t-shirts.  Dead Poetic has released three albums and one Best of album.  In 2006, the band released their final record, Vices.  Since releasing the album, they have not toured or played a live show, and since November 20, 2007, no news regarding Dead Poetic has been publicly issued.

Rike has confirmed that Dead Poetic will release the final album on their contract, but will not continue thereafter. "We plan to record another album. We love making music. We do not plan to tour."

Dark Collar
Since 1999, Rike has been a self-employed graphic designer.  90% of the work out of Dark Collar has been band T-shirts, logos, or merchandise. As of 2010, Rike has dropped the company name of Dark Collar and is now working under his name.

At Night We Strike
Recently, Brandon has teamed up with Ryan Sprague, and Lucas Starr formerly of Oh, Sleeper to create this new band. Their debut single, "Your Own Skin", from the upcoming full-length album produced by Andy Gomoll, was released on March 15, 2013 on their official website.

References

External links
 http://brandonrike.com/
 https://web.archive.org/web/20110708025738/http://brandonrike.blogspot.com/
 https://web.archive.org/web/20091126031852/http://virb.com/brandonrike

1983 births
Living people
American graphic designers
American rock singers
People from Canton, Ohio
American performers of Christian music
Artists from Columbus, Ohio
Singers from Ohio
21st-century American singers
21st-century American male singers